Larry Polowski (born September 15, 1957) is a former American football linebacker. He played for the Seattle Seahawks in 1979.

References

1957 births
Living people
American football linebackers
Boise State Broncos football players
Seattle Seahawks players